Ajay Kapoor (born 21 February 1967) is an Indian politician from Kanpur. He won the Assembly elections for the first time in 2002 from Govind Nagar with a margin of 53,000 votes as the INC candidate, he again won the elections in 2007 from Govind Nagar afterwards. In the 2012 Assembly Election, he won for a third time Assembly Elections but this time from Kidwai Nagar as the INC candidate which is a part of earlier Govind Nagar constituency.

On 7 January 2017, the Uttar Pradesh election commission filed a show cause notice against Kapoor for violating election conduct rules ahead of the upcoming Assembly elections. Kapoor had laid the foundation stone with his name for the St. Thomas School road three days earlier, which is against conduct rules.

He lost his seat in the 2017 Uttar Pradesh Assembly election to Mahesh Trivedi of the Bharatiya Janata Party.

References

Indian National Congress politicians from Uttar Pradesh
Uttar Pradesh MLAs 2012–2017
Uttar Pradesh MLAs 2002–2007
Uttar Pradesh MLAs 2007–2012
Politicians from Kanpur
Living people
1967 births